The Tupolev Tu-244 was a proposed supersonic transport (SST) aircraft, developed from the Tu-144. The project was cancelled in 1993.

History
The draft work began in 1979, and when the project ended in 1993 substantial progress had already been made during the interpretation. Specifically, the air resistance in the range of Mach 2 was only 50% higher than a conventional passenger airliner traveling at a speed of Mach 0,9.

The nearly-circular fuselage ( width,  height) and the wing unit would have consisted to a large extent of titanium-composite materials. The engines were to be higher performance hydrogen-fuelled versions of the Kuznetsov NK-321 turbofan, used also with the Tu-160. Adjustable air intake ramps from the Tu-160 might have been included. Projected passenger capacity was 311.

Fly-by-wire was intended for flight control. Rather than using a tilting nose, video cameras were to provide the crew with the necessary view for landings.

Specifications

See also

References

 .
 .

Tu-0244
Supersonic transports
Abandoned civil aircraft projects
Tailless delta-wing aircraft
Quadjets